Diego Montiel may refer to:

 Diego Montiel (footballer, born 1995), Swedish midfielder
 Diego Montiel (footballer, born 1996) (1996-2021), Argentine midfielder